José Semedo may refer to:
José Orlando Semedo (born 1965), Portuguese former football midfielder
José Filipe Correia Semedo (born 1979), Cape Verdean football forward
José Vítor Moreira Semedo (born 1985), Portuguese football midfielder
José Carlos Costa Semedo (born 1992), Santomean football forward